Euphaedra phosphor is a butterfly in the family Nymphalidae. It is found in western Tanzania, Burundi and the south-eastern part of the Democratic Republic of the Congo. The habitat consists of forests, including riparian forests.

The larvae feed on Poliscias species.

References

Butterflies described in 1921
phosphor